David De Gruttola (born June 9, 1969), known by his pseudonym David Cage, is a French video game designer, writer and musician. He is the founder of the game development studio Quantic Dream. Cage both wrote and directed the video games Heavy Rain and Beyond: Two Souls for the PlayStation 3, and Detroit: Become Human for the PlayStation 4 and Microsoft Windows.

Biography
Born in Mulhouse, France, Cage is the head of the game developer studio Quantic Dream. Cage plays a central role in the company and the development of the games, being founder, co-CEO (with Guillaume de Fondaumière), director, lead game designer, and screenwriter. As a professional musician, he created the company Totem Interactive in 1993, which worked in music and sound productions. He worked as a freelance musician on several television, film and video game projects, involved with original soundtrack work.

His earlier works include the music in the video games Super Dany (1994, credited as David De Gruttola), Cheese Cat-Astrophe Starring Speedy Gonzales (1995, credited as David De Gruttola), Timecop (1995), and Hardline (1996). David Cage founded Quantic Dream in 1997. He has written and directed all five games released by the studio: Omikron: The Nomad Soul (1999), Fahrenheit / Indigo Prophecy (2005), Heavy Rain (2010), Beyond: Two Souls (2013) and Detroit: Become Human (2018).

At the British Academy Games Awards, in which Quantic Dream won three awards for Heavy Rain, Cage stated that "games always explore the same things. They're about being powerful, being the good guys against the bad guys – that's a very tiny part of what can be done. There are so many other stories to tell, so many other emotions to trigger – this is a fantastic new medium, we can do much more than we currently do with it." Game developer Warren Spector described Cage as one of the best storytellers in the business, calling him a genius.

Cage has been critical of "game over" events in story-driven, non-action video games, calling them "a failure of the game design". Cage was the first game developer to receive the Legion of Honour, the highest decoration granted in France. In October 2018, he received a Ping Honor Award for his career.

In 2018, Quantic Dream was involved in a lawsuit with Le Monde and Mediapart, accusing the studio of fostering a toxic workplace, after it was found that one of the employees had been photoshopping pictures of other employees. In April 2021, Quantic Dream won an appeal overturning a July 2018 ruling in favour of a former employee who sued the studio. It was later alleged that Cage said that all the female characters in his games were "whores" and that Quantic Dream "didn't make games for fags". Cage denied these allegations by saying "I have never said or even thought such things. I fully understand people were shocked by seeing those words, and I am deeply sorry for the pain and confusion they have caused to women and the LGBTQIA+ community. The quotes are abhorrent, and they do not reflect my views, nor the views of anyone at Quantic Dream." Representatives of LGBTQ+ employees at the studio defended Cage, stating that deeply hurtful and misleading perceptions "do not reflect [their] everyday lives at work".

Personal life
Cage is an atheist.

Credits
Director and writer
 Omikron: The Nomad Soul (1999)
 Fahrenheit (2005)
 Heavy Rain: The Casting (2006; demo)
 Heavy Rain (2010)
 Heavy Rain: Chronicle One - The Taxidermist (2010; DLC)
 Kara (2012; demo)
 The Dark Sorcerer (2013; demo)
 Beyond: Two Souls (2013)
 Detroit: Become Human (2018)

Composer
 Super Dany (1994)
 Cheese Cat-Astrophe Starring Speedy Gonzales (1995)
 Timecop (1995)
 Hardline (1996)
 Detroit: Become Human (2018, opening sequence)

References

1969 births
French atheists
French composers
French video game designers
Living people
Musicians from Mulhouse
Video game directors
Video game writers
Quantic Dream